Romain Cazes (1810–1881) was a French historical painter.

Life
Cazes was born at St. Béat (Haute-Garonne) in 1810. He was a pupil of Ingres, and is known chiefly by his portraits and subjects from sacred history. His paintings and murals decorate the Paris churches of St. Francois Xavier and Notre-Dame de Clignancourt, as well as churches in the provinces. Like all of the pupils of Ingres, except for Flandrin, he never rose above mediocrity, and died in 1881.

References

Sources
 

1810 births
1881 deaths
People from Haute-Garonne
19th-century French painters
French male painters
19th-century painters of historical subjects
19th-century French male artists